Nebria mniszechii is a species of ground beetle in the Nebriinae subfamily that is endemic to Georgia.

References

mniszechii
Beetles described in 1854
Beetles of Asia
Endemic fauna of Georgia (country)